Alice in Sunderland: An Entertainment is a 2007 graphic novel by comics writer and artist Bryan Talbot. It explores the links between Lewis Carroll and the Sunderland area, with wider themes of history, myth and storytelling.

Overview

The artwork for the main cover was drawn and made by graphic artist Jordan Smith. His daughter, Kaya Anna Lawson (Smith) is the model for Alice. She is featured on the front cover as Tenniel's Alice, as well as inside the book as her normal self.

The work relates local history. It focuses upon the eponymous city, but also covers other towns and cities in North East England, such as Newcastle upon Tyne, Durham and Hartlepool. Local legends and tales are documented, including The Lambton Worm and the monkey hanged in Hartlepool.

It is published in the UK by Jonathan Cape, and in the US by Dark Horse.

Exhibition

"Alice in Sunderland: The Exhibition" displayed work from the graphic novel, as well as exploring the various influences. It ran from April 5 to July 1, 2007, at The Cartoon Museum.

Awards
 BSFA Award nominee, Best Novel
 2008: Nominated for "Favourite Original Graphic Novel" Eagle Award

Notes

References

External links
 Alice in Sunderland: the official homepage

Interviews
 Artist in Sunderland: Bryan Talbot, March, 2007
 Curioser and curioser – Bryan draws on Alice, Sunderland Echo, March 17, 2008
 Review by The Guardian

2007 graphic novels
2007 comics debuts
Comics based on Alice in Wonderland
British graphic novels
City of Sunderland
Comics by Bryan Talbot
Dark Horse Comics graphic novels
Jonathan Cape books